Compsocryptus is a genus of ichneumon wasps in the family Ichneumonidae. There are at least 18 described species in Compsocryptus.

Species
These species belong to the genus Compsocryptus:

 Compsocryptus apicalis Townes, 1962
 Compsocryptus aridus Townes, 1962
 Compsocryptus buccatus (Cresson, 1872)
 Compsocryptus calipterus (Say, 1835)
 Compsocryptus fletcheri (Provancher, 1888)
 Compsocryptus fuscofasciatus (Brulle, 1846)
 Compsocryptus hugoi Kasparyan & Ruiz-Cancino, 2005
 Compsocryptus jamiesoni Nolfo, 1982
 Compsocryptus melanostigma (Brulle, 1846)
 Compsocryptus orientalis Alayo & Tzankov, 1974
 Compsocryptus pallens Townes, 1962
 Compsocryptus resolutus (Cresson, 1879)
 Compsocryptus stangei Porter, 1989
 Compsocryptus texensis Townes, 1962
 Compsocryptus tricinctus Townes, 1962
 Compsocryptus turbatus (Cresson, 1879)
 Compsocryptus unicolor Townes, 1962
 Compsocryptus xanthostigma (Brulle, 1846)

References

Parasitic wasps
Ichneumonidae genera
Ichneumonidae